The Potton–Hayden House is a historic house in Big Spring, Texas, USA. It was built in 1901. It has been listed on the National Register of Historic Places since April 14, 1975.

The house is owned by the Heritage Museum of Big Spring and open for tours by appointment.

See also

National Register of Historic Places listings in Howard County, Texas
Recorded Texas Historic Landmarks in Howard County

References

External links
 Potton House - Heritage Museum of Big Spring

Houses on the National Register of Historic Places in Texas
Queen Anne architecture in Texas
Houses completed in 1901
Buildings and structures in Howard County, Texas
National Register of Historic Places in Howard County, Texas
Recorded Texas Historic Landmarks
Historic house museums in Texas
Museums in Howard County, Texas